Typhlomangelia corona is a species of sea snail, a marine gastropod mollusk in the family Borsoniidae.

Description

Distribution

References

 Laseron, C. F. (1954). Revision of the New South Wales Turridae. Royal Zoological Society of New South Wales Australian Zoological Handbook. Sydney: Royal Zoological Society of New South Wales. 56 pp., 12 pls.

corona
Gastropods described in 1954